A list of British films released in 1921.

1921

See also
 1921 in film
 1921 in the United Kingdom

References

External links
 

1921
Films
Lists of 1921 films by country or language
1920s in British cinema